Grzegorz Michał Braun (born 11 March 1967) is a  Polish far-right politician, journalist, academic lecturer, movie director and screenwriter. He is the leader of the Confederation of the Polish Crown and one of the leaders of Confederation Liberty and Independence. He was elected to the Sejm in 2019.

Biography
Grzegorz Braun was born in Toruń, Poland. His father, Kazimierz Braun, is a movie director. His mother is Zofia, née Reklewska, while his maternal grandfather was Wincenty Sebastian Reklewski. Grzegorz is a nephew of Juliusz Braun (former network director of Telewizja Polska) and a brother of actress Monika Braun.

He graduated from the University of Wrocław in 1987, and completed postgraduate studies at the Krzysztof Kieślowski Faculty of Radio and Television at the University of Silesia in Katowice in 1993. From 1987 onward he co-organized activities of the Orange Alternative, for which he was oppressed by the communist government of the Polish People's Republic. In 1988 and 1989, he participated in student protests at the University of Wrocław. He was also active in the Polish-Czech-Slovak Solidarity.

Later, he also was a journalist for, inter alia, the Option Right and the Polskie Radio Wrocław. Until 2007, he taught journalism at the University of Wrocław. As a movie director, he produced and directed over 30 titles, including: Transformation, New Poland, Correction to Biography, Positive Additions and Negative Additions, Comrade General Goes to War, Martin Luther and the Protestant Revolution, Smolensk Assassination. He is a co-founder of the Errata TV series, revealing the biographies of former Polish communist agents.

He was involved with the Polish Monarchists Organization, for which he contributed written works and lectures. He is involved with "Wake-up Call" ("Pobudka") an organisation that he has founded to strengthen the self-sustainability of faith communities and the internet TV channel "Sumienie Narodu."

Braun is a Traditionalist Catholic. He is fiercely critical of Protestantism in Poland and has often debated Protestants in public.

Political activity
 
Braun's political views are based on the assessment of Polish history with special attention to the 1050th anniversary of Poland's acceptance of Christianity. He is opposed to the idea of Poland being a state dependent on and controlled by the European Union. He believes that Poland's continuous prosperity can only be guaranteed by the preservation of traditional family values, the principles of Roman Catholic faith, and faith-based education. His political views are far-right. He is a proponent of revisions to the legacy of former president Lech Wałęsa based on Wałęsa's alleged cooperation with the communist secret service. He is a proponent of revisions to the current Polish government's investigation of the 2010 Polish Air Force Tu-154 crash (Polish presidential airplane crash) at Smolensk. His economic views can be described as classically liberal as he supports a tax per head and cutting VAT tax.

On 24 January 2015, he announced his candidacy to run for the office of the President of Poland. In February 2015 he started campaigning in the United States among Polish immigrants and Americans of Polish descent. On 5 August 2015, he formed his own campaign committee God Bless You! (Szczęść Boże!) while receiving only 13,113 votes amounting to a 0,09% of the total cast he withdrew from the parliamentary elections in the fall of 2015.

In August 2016, Braun took part in a conference organized by the Center for European Policy Analysis reporting on Russian propaganda in the former Soviet satellite countries. He suggested maintaining a controlled balance between the EU and Russia. National Movement presidential candidate Marian Kowalski criticized Braun for not trusting NATO forces stationing in Poland as a legitimate defence against Russia. Braun calls for Poland to independently maintain and operate nuclear weapons.

In January 2019, Braun announced his candidacy for the mayoral office of Gdańsk. The unexpected early elections were called after the murder of mayor Paweł Adamowicz. Braun's candidacy has been endorsed by Janusz Korwin-Mikke and the National Movement. On 4 March 2019, it was determined that Braun received 11.86% votes and thus conceded to the winner Aleksandra Dulkiewicz who received 82.22% votes.

In the 2019 European Parliament election in Poland Braun was the leading candidate for the Confederation in the Podkarpackie Voivodeship. Although his list received 5.89% of the vote, the best result for Confederation in the country, the coalition failed to reach the 5% threshold nationwide and so he did not pick up the seat.

In the 2019 Polish parliamentary election Braun was the leading candidate for the Confederation Liberty and Independence in the Rzeszów Constituency, located in the Podkarpackie Voivodeship. He built on his success from the last election, and his list received 8.25% of the vote, which was again the best result for the Confederation nationwide. This time Braun picked up the seat, as did 10 other candidates from the Confederation.

He was a candidate in the 2020 Confederation presidential primary. He made it into the final round of voting where he lost to Krzysztof Bosak. He immediately endorsed Bosak and said he would campaign for him.

References

External links
 

1967 births
Polish anti-abortion activists
Anti-Masonry
Anti-Zionism in Poland
Candidates in the 2015 Polish presidential election
Confederation Liberty and Independence politicians
Polish conservatives
Far-right politics in Poland
Gun rights advocates
Living people
Anti-Islam sentiment in Poland
Opposition to sex education
People from Toruń
Polish biographers
Polish documentary film directors
20th-century Polish historians
Polish male non-fiction writers
Polish monarchists
Polish opinion journalists
Polish screenwriters
Polish traditionalist Catholics
Political historians
Traditionalist Catholic conspiracy theorists
University of Silesia in Katowice alumni
University of Wrocław alumni
Academic staff of the University of Wrocław
Members of the Polish Sejm 2019–2023
Polish conspiracy theorists